Rahatullah  (23 June 1989 – 11 February 2008) (راحة الله) was a Pakistani first-class cricketer.

A right-arm seam bowler, Rahatullah played three matches for his home city of Peshawar in the 2007–08 Quaid-i-Azam Trophy. He had previously represented the Pakistan Under-19 cricket team with whom he toured both Australia and India.

On 11 February 2008 he was on his way to Arbab Niaz Stadium where he was due to join the North West Frontier Province squad when he was shot dead by unknown assailants.

See also
List of cricketers who were murdered

References

Sources

Article on his shooting

1989 births
2008 deaths
Deaths by firearm in Khyber Pakhtunkhwa
Male murder victims
Pakistani murder victims
Pakistani cricketers
Peshawar cricketers
People murdered in Pakistan
Cricketers from Peshawar